Joseph Frederick Brent (born April 6, 1976) is an American composer, mandolinist, multi-instrumentalist, and teacher. He is known for his performances and arrangements of rock and indie songs, as well as his original compositions with the ensemble 9 Horses. He teaches classical mandolin at Mannes College.

Brent attended the Berklee College of Music, and studied the mandolin under Carlo Aonzo in Savona, Italy. He also received instruction from Barry Mitterhoff and Adam Steffey.

In addition to his teaching responsibilities, Brent is active as a sideman in several rock, jazz, bluegrass, and folk ensembles, most notably with Regina Spektor, Jewel, Kishi Bashi, Gary Smulyan, and various artists centered on the Brooklyn folk music scene.

Brent also records and has performed with symphony orchestras such as the Seattle Symphony, San Francisco Symphony, Chicago Symphony, International Contemporary Ensemble, nunc, and the New World Symphony.

On October 16, 2015, Brent's improvising ensemble 9 Horses, featuring violinist Sara Caswell and bassist Shawn Conley released their debut album Perfectest Herald on Sunnyside Records, and in 2016 were the winners of the 21CM LAUNCH: Emerging Artists Competition.

In 2022 Brent founded Adhyâropa Records along with 9 Horses bandmate Andrew Ryan. In addition to releasing Omegah and subsequent material by 9 Horses and its associated members, Adhyâropa has also released albums by Sam Sadigursky, Dallas Ugly, and others.

Brent has published two books of mandolin pedagogy, Scales and Arpeggios for Mandolin and Orchestral and Chamber Excerpts for Mandolin, and his book of transcriptions of the lute music of John Dowland for two mandolins, conceived with Alon Sariel, was published in 2015 by paladino music.

Customized instruments
In 2008, Brent collaborated with Nova Scotia-based luthier Brian Dean to design a grand concert mandolin he named 'Pähkinä', which is Finnish for 'nut', a reference to the walnut top of the instrument. Among the instrument's many distinctive features are the walnut/maple/spruce wood combination, a zero fret, a semi-lute construction with minimal bracing, a built-in tone guard with a sound pressure relief hole cut into the back, and ornate f-holes which reach around the sides of the instrument. Dean has since built a 10-string version of this model nicknamed 'Kumí', which is currently Brent's primary acoustic instrument. In 2016, Vermont-based luthier Adam Buchwald built him a 5-string, fanned fret electric mandolin.

Discography

Solo 
 Point of Departure (2007)
|-
| 2002
| Tom Jones & Harvey Schmidt
| Roadside (original cast recording)
| mandolin, violin, guitar, banjo
|-
| 2003
| Eric Stuart Band
| BombShellShocked
| violin
|-
| 2006
| Jacques Brel is Alive and Well and Living in Paris
| 2006 off-Broadway revival cast recording
| mandolin, violin
|-
| 2008
| Lindsay Katt
| Picking Out Boxes
| violin
|-
| rowspan="2"| 2010 || Regina Spektor || Live In London || violin 
|-
| Joseph Stein & Stan Daniels || Enter Laughing (Original Cast Recording) || violin
|-
| rowspan="2"| 2012 || Bryan Dunn || Sweetheart of the Music Hall || mandolin, vocals 
|-
| Miller & Tysen || Fugitive Songs || mandolin, violin
|-
| rowspan="4" | 2013 || Kishi Bashi || 7" Box Set || violin
|-
| Erin McKeown || MANIFESTRA || violin, piano, string arrangements
|-
| Kelli Rae Powell || Live at Jalopy || mandolin, violin
|-
| Gary Smulyan || Bella Napoli || mandolin, violin
|-
| 2014 
| Lauren Kinhan 
| Circle in a Square 
| violin
|-
| rowspan="5" | 2015 || Maxine Linehan || Beautiful Songs || mandolin, percussion, violin
|-
| Andi Rae Healy || If You Want To Be My Man || mandolin
|-
| King Radio || King Radio || mandolin, violin
|-
| Kishi Bashi || String Quartet Live! || mandolin, violin
|-
| Lina Orfanos || Mauthausen || mandolin
|-
| 2016 
| Kishi Bashi 
| The Fourth Phase (Original Soundtrack) 
| violin
|-
| 2018 
| Various Artists 
| I Only Listen to the Mountain Goats: All Hail West Texas 
| electric mandolin, string arrangements with Erin McKeown on 'Jenny'
|-
| 2019 
| Richard Rodgers and Oscar Hammerstein || Oklahoma! (2019 Revival) || mandolin, guitar
|-
| 2022
| Lara Downes || Reflections: Scott Joplin Reconsidered || mandolin, vihuela
|-
| 2023
| James Moore || Desolation Pops || vocals
|}

Books 
Scales and Arpeggios for Mandolin. Lulu Publishing. 2007.
Orchestral and Chamber Excerpts for Mandolin.  Lulu Publishing.  2007.
An Englishman in New York: Famous Lute Pieces Arranged for Two Mandolins.  paladino media gmbh. 2015.

References

External links 

Official home page
9 Horses

Living people
Musicians from Queens, New York
American jazz composers
American folk rock musicians
American jazz mandolinists
American classical mandolinists
People from Flushing, Queens
Musicians from Tampa, Florida
People from Dutchess County, New York
People from Beacon, New York
American music educators
1976 births
American jazz musicians
Chamber jazz musicians
American multi-instrumentalists
Jewish American classical musicians
Jewish violinists
American expatriates in Italy
American folk musicians
American male violinists
American jazz violinists
Berklee College of Music alumni
Jazz musicians from New York (state)
Educators from New York City
Classical musicians from New York (state)
21st-century American violinists
American male jazz composers
21st-century American male musicians
9 Horses members
21st-century American Jews